Padawan is a sub-district of Kuching District, Sarawak, Malaysia. The name is also used to refer to the local government in Sarawak, the Padawan Municipal Council (Majlis Perbandaran Padawan), and to Bidayuh Village, which is also known as Kampung Padawan. The Jalan Padawan is the name of a road near mile 23 of Kuching-Serian Highway.

Geography

Demographics

SJK(C) Chung Hua Batu 10
SK Pangkalan Ampat

Municipal Services

Transportation

Padawan is connected with Kuching-serian Highway, while 10th mile junction has its own Borneo Heights Link, uptown towards Borneo Highland Resort. Air transportation can be reached by Kuching International Airport(KIA), about 4 miles from Kota Padawan(10th mile), hotspot area. Most land transportation are taxis, buses, mini van (or called  'Van Sapu') which still popular among the region.

Entertainment

Notable people

Images

See also
Kampung Mundai

References

Kuching District